Richard Lamar "Ricky" Hawk (born January 22, 1998), better known as Silentó or actor Prince Silentó, is a former American rapper, singer, and songwriter. He is best known for his 2015 debut single "Watch Me (Whip/Nae Nae)", which charted at number three on the US Billboard Hot 100. He later released a project titled Fresh Outta High School in August 2018 after some delay. He is a native of Stone Mountain, Georgia.

On February 1, 2021, he was arrested in DeKalb County, Georgia and charged with multiple murder-related counts in the shooting death of his cousin, Frederick Rooks. He is currently being held without bond.

Career 
Silentó's debut single, "Watch Me (Whip/Nae Nae)", made with Bolo Da Producer, was released on his YouTube channel on June 25, 2015. Over the course of one week, it gained over 2.5 million views. After making the song when he was 17 years old in his basement and having already garnered more than 100,000 streams on SoundCloud, A&R Executive Alex Wilhelm approached and signed him to Capitol Records. They then released the track as a single with an accompanying music video. It peaked at number three on the US Billboard Hot 100. In June 2015, Silentó performed at the BET Awards, alongside the cast of the show Black-ish.

He also performed the hit single on December 31, 2016, in Times Square for Dick Clark's New Year's Rockin' Eve with Ryan Seacrest. On August 3, 2018, Silentó released his first album, Fresh Outta High School, which was originally scheduled to be released on May 25. He later released Fresh Outta High School Part 2 on November 29, 2018.

Legal issues 
On August 28, 2020, he was arrested following a domestic disturbance. After being charged with inflicting corporal injury on a spouse or cohabitant he was released. The following day he was again arrested in Valley Village, Los Angeles after walking into a stranger's home wielding a hatchet while looking for his girlfriend.

Silentó was arrested again on October 23, 2020.

Murder charges 
On February 1, 2021, he was arrested in DeKalb County and charged with malice murder and felony murder, among other charges in the shooting and death of his cousin. Police responded to a shots fired call on January 21, 2021, at around 3:30 a.m. in the Panthersville area, and he was booked into the DeKalb jail on one count of murder. He was indicted on August 3, 2021, on charges of malice murder, felony murder, aggravated assault and possession of a firearm while committing a felony.

Discography

Mixtapes

Extended plays

Singles

As lead artist

As featured artist

Promotional singles

Guest appearances

Awards and nominations

References 

1998 births
2021 murders in the United States
21st-century African-American musicians
21st-century American male musicians
21st-century American rappers
African-American male rappers
African-American songwriters
American male songwriters
Capitol Records artists
Living people
People charged with assault
People charged with murder
People from Stone Mountain, Georgia
Pop rappers
Songwriters from Georgia (U.S. state)
Southern hip hop musicians